Paul Knapman DL was Her Majesty's coroner for Westminster (and Inner West London), from 1980 to 2011 (and Deputy Coroner from 1975 to 1980).  His responsibility for investigating sudden deaths as an independent judicial officer saw him preside over numerous notable cases.

He was made a Deputy Lieutenant of Greater London in 2008 and advanced to the representative Deputy Lieutenant for Westminster in 2013.

Early life
Paul Knapman went to Epsom College, Surrey, King's College London, and St George's Hospital Medical School, London, where he qualified as a doctor – MB, BS (1968). He then proceeded to read for the Bar at the Council of Legal Education, and was called to the Bar as a barrister by Gray's Inn in 1972.

Honours
 Two medicolegal diplomas, namely DMJ in 1975 and FFLM in 2005
 FRCP (Honoris Causa) in 1997
 FRCS (Honoris Causa) in 1995

Cases and events

 Inquest re: Sandra Rivett, Nanny to Lord Lucan in 1975 (Deputy Coroner)
 Inquest re: Georgi Markov in 1978 (Deputy Coroner)
 Iranian Embassy siege in 1980
 Libyan Embassy Siege in 1984
 Clapham Rail Disaster in 1988
 Marchioness Boat Disaster in 1989
 The Ladbroke Grove Rail Disaster in 1999
 7 July 2005 London bombings (as Lead Coroner) in 2005
 Inquest into Diana, Princess of Wales & Dodi Al-Fayed in 2006 (he appointed as his deputy Baroness Butler-Sloss 2006 & then subsequently Lord Justice Scott Baker in 2007, who conducted the inquest)

As coroner he dealt with approximately 85,000 deaths and 12,500 inquests (including about 500 murder/manslaughter cases). One of his last major cases (October 2010) was presiding over the inquest of the barrister Mark Saunders, controversially shot to death by Metropolitan Police on 6 May 2008. After the ruling of 'lawful killing'  Knapman revealed that he would use his powers as coroner to highlight lessons that should be learned by the police for the future and would make copies of his recommendation available to Secretary of State for Justice, Kenneth Clarke.

Sandra Rivett, Nanny to Lord Lucan, 1975
As the Deputy Coroner he was much involved with the preparation of the inquest into the death of Sandra Rivett, nanny to the children of Lord Lucan. He sat with the coroner during the inquest (16–19 November June 1975), when the jury returned the verdict that Lord Lucan should stand trial at The Old Bailey charged with the murder of Sandra Rivett. Lord Lucan had disappeared and has never been found.

Georgi Markov, 1978
As Deputy Coroner he was consulted and involved in all stages following the death of Georgi Markov, who died on 11 November 1978. Markov was a Bulgarian working for the BBC World Service and considered a thorn in the side of the Communist authorities. His cause of death was by a pellet probably containing ricin (which was never actually analysed). Although the press and others showed diagrams of the poison's administration by an umbrella, no umbrella was ever found.

Iranian Embassy Siege, 1980
At that time the US Embassy in Tehran was besieged by the Iranian Authorities with the American citizens working in the Embassy having been taken hostage. President Carter sanctioned a rescue by US forces, but the US helicopters unfortunately came down in the desert and the hostage rescue had to be abandoned. Subsequently, the Iranian Embassy in London was seized by six terrorists on 30 April, and they shot one hostage. The Home Secretary, William Whitelaw, handed control of the situation from the Metropolitan Police to the British Army.

Then, it being a Bank holiday weekend, in the full blaze of publicity and live television, soldiers of the Special Air Service (SAS) successfully rescued the hostages on 5 May. At the subsequent inquest the jury learnt that during the rescue another hostage was killed by a terrorist and five terrorists were shot and killed by the SAS. One terrorist survived. At the inquest the jury unanimously returned a verdict of justifiable homicide concerning the death of the terrorists.

Libyan Embassy Siege, 1984
On 17 April in 1984 there was a protest demonstration outside the Libyan Embassy in St.James' Square, London. Shots were fired from the Embassy injuring demonstrators and killing WPC Yvonne Fletcher. At the inquest it was shown that the shots came from the first floor of the Embassy and the pathologist Dr. West opined that her fatal injury was consistent with this. The inquest jury concluded she was unlawfully killed.

Clapham Junction rail crash, 1988
On Monday 12 December 1988, just outside Clapham Junction railway station a crowded train from Basingstoke was shunted at speed from behind by a following train from Bournemouth, a third train from London on the adjacent line collided with the wreckage, a fourth train stopped in time. thirty-five people were killed.

The site of the crash and the dead were within the jurisdiction of the Coroner for Inner West London and the bodies were taken to an expanded mortuary at Westminster. All the inquests were opened and adjourned at Westminster Coroner's Court.

The inquests into all 35 people were subsequently held at a special court at Westminster Council House. It started with a very brief outline of the timings and mechanisms of the accident. Then subsequently the Coroner and jury heard the following evidence regarding each of the deceased: an outline of personal details, including character of each person provided by a relative; evidence of how precisely they were identified; an indication of where precisely they were at the time of the collision, assisted by visual aids; and a brief summary of injuries and the cause of death provided by the pathologist.

Then, having heard the evidence on each of the 35 people, the Coroner announced he was adjourning the inquest for a Public Enquiry to be held by Anthony Hidden QC who had been appointed for that purpose by The Secretary of State for Transport under regulations of The Railways Act 1871.

The cause of the crash was found to be that a wiring fault in signalling mean that the signal would not show red even though the track circuit ahead was occupied by a train. Re-wiring had recently been performed on Clapham Junction A box, and redundant wires had not been cut back and insulated sufficiently causing a false feed. A number of recommendations were made. (Ref: Hidden 1989) Following a prosecution, British Rail were fined £250,000 for a breach of the Health & Safety at Work etc. Act. Knapman concluded it was not necessary to resume the inquests.

Marchioness disaster, 1989

On 20 August 1989 the pleasure boat Marchioness was struck by the dredger Bowbelle on the River Thames in London. This fatal collision resulted in the death of 51 people. Knapman was the coroner, Dr Dolman was deputising as Knapman was out of London at that time.

Having returned to London, although not specifically recalling it, Knapman said that had he been asked by the Metropolitan Police he would certainly have given consent for hands to be removed from the decomposed bodies. This was standard practice for all London coroners at the time for any bodies that were badly decomposed (especially by water).  During an inquiry into Knapman's actions he stated the hands had been removed for identification purposes in an attempt to get identification of the victims to their families as soon as practically possible.  However, subsequently it was determined that at least 12 of the victims who had their hands removed were simultaneously in the process of potential dental identification that might have resulted in identification sooner. Visual identification is not considered reliable in such circumstances and many errors have occurred in the past leading to greater distress.

In 1992 Knapman refused to resume the inquest into the victims deaths adding that there had been four inquiries/court proceedings already.  In January 1993, mothers of two of the victims, began legal action for judicial review of his decision.

In June 1994, after a judicial review, the Court of Appeal heard the appeal. Lord Justice Brown said "no-one should interpret this judgement as a condemnation of Knapman, almost without exception he handled the many difficulties he faced not merely with sensitivity but with an evident sympathy for the bereaved families. Understandably, and indeed justifiably riled by an unfair article in The Mail on Sunday he was guilty of but a single intemperate comment". Lord Justice Farquharson said "the various affidavits and other documents in these proceedings clearly demonstrate that the Coroner was most concerned about the welfare of the bereaved families and he repeatedly consulted them, indeed the lengths he went to showed that his actions went far beyond those normally expected of a Coroner." Sir Thomas Bingham, The Master of the Rolls said, "I reach this decision with regret, the Coroner reacted to this horrific tragedy with energy and public spirit. He went to great lengths to treat the bereaved with sympathy and understanding.....the issue for this court is however, the single limited question. Conscious though I am of the great difficulty in which the Coroner was placed, I never the less feel bound to reach the conclusion I have expressed." Knapman and Dolman were stood down and a new coroner was appointed by the High Court and Home Office, Dr John Burton. Burton then held an Inquest into all the Marchioness deaths.

In February 2000 Deputy Prime Minister John Prescott announced that he had ordered a Public Enquiry into the circumstances surrounding the Marchioness disaster. During a Non-Statutory Inquiry into the Identification of the 51 Victims, overseen by Lord Justice Clarke. Clarke also expressed his concerns over the removal of the hands of the victims. Some of the family members of the victims urged Knapman to resign and stated they would call on the Home Secretary if action was not taken against him. However, Knapman continued to act as coroner for London and Westminster for another 11 years and acted in several high-profile cases.

Ladbroke Grove rail crash, 1999
The Ladbroke Grove Rail crash (also known as The Paddington Rail crash) occurred on 5 October 1999. On that day in the morning, a Thames train to Bedwyn in Wiltshire left Paddington Station and collided head on with a First Great Western train travelling into Paddington from Cheltenham. The combined speed was 130 mph and ignited fuel, caused a fireball and the first carriage of the Cheltenham train was totally burnt out. Both drivers and 29 passengers, a total of 31 people were killed. The site of the crash and the dead came within the jurisdiction of the Coroner for Inner West London and the bodies were taken to an expanded mortuary at Westminster. All the inquests were opened and adjourned at Westminster Coroner's Court.

The inquests into all 31 dead was subsequently held at a special court at Westminster Council House. Each started with a very brief outline of the timings and mechanism of the accident. The Coroner heard the following evidence regarding each of the deceased: an outline of personal details, including character of each person provided by a relative; an indication of where it was estimated they were at the time of the collision assisted by visual aids; and a brief summary of the injuries and the cause of death (mostly severe burns) was provided by a pathologist.

Then, having heard all the evidence a contrivance was shared and announced, that a letter from The Lord Chancellor had just been delivered. The letter requested the Coroner to adjourn the inquest pending the result of a public enquiry conducted by Lord Cullen. This contrivance was as a consequence of legislation passed only a month earlier, whereby the Lord Chancellor could require an inquest to be adjourned and only resumed if the Coroner "believes there is exceptional reason for doing so".

The cause of the crash was found to be the driver of the Thames train from Paddington passing signal SN109 at red, probably due to bad sighting of SN109 and bright sunlight at a low angle, and other factors outlined. There had been previous difficulty with this signal and eight events of "signal passed at danger – SPAD" in the proceeding six years. Significant other problems surfaced, resulting in the creation of the Rail Safety Standards Board in 2003.

In 2004 Thames Trains was fined a record £2,000,000 and were ordered to pay £75,000 in costs. The inquest was not resumed.

7/7 London Bombings, 2005
On 7 July 2005 in the morning four separate suicide bombs exploded at approximately the same time in London. The first suicide bomb exploded on a London Underground train close to Aldgate Station, the second suicide bomb exploded on a London Underground train close to Edgware Road Station, a third suicide bomb exploded on a London Underground Train close to King's Cross/Russell Square Stations. A fourth suicide bomb exploded almost one hour later on a double decker bus at Tavistock Square. It was originally thought there had been six rather than three explosions on the Underground Network as smoke billowed out of both ends of the tunnels. The bus brought the number to seven but this was clarified to four sites later in the day.

The number of fatalities were seven at Aldgate, six at Edgware Road, twenty-six at Kings Cross/Russell Square and thirteen at Tavistock Square plus the four suicide bombers themselves making a total number of 56 fatalities.

As there were four sites of the bombings it happened that there were two other coroners involved apart from Knapman. He was the "Incident" or "Lead Coroner" for the first 10 days until all the bodies had been identified. Knapman then handed over to Dr. Andrew Reid, Coroner for Inner North London, as the Incident Coroner. Unusually, quite apart from the anti-terrorist police, there were three police forces involved namely The Metropolitan Police, The British Transport Police and The City of London Police.

A "temporary mortuary" was set up at The Honourable Artillery Company Headquarters at City Road, London EC1. The challenges were: there had been four sites of the bombs; many thousands of "missing persons" reported initially; a cosmopolitan city; disrupted bodies; and computer hard and software of 2005. For the first time features of Lord Justice Clark's report "identification of victims following Major Transport Accidents" were used. This put the Coroner in overall charge, but with a Senior Identification Manager (and Deputy), together with a Mortuary Documentation Officer, from within the police. There was also an "Identification Commission" chaired by the Coroner to scrutinise all documentation etc. before an identification was absolutely confirmed. Inquests were opened and adjourned by each of the three Coroners.

It was considered prudent that all the inquests be transferred to Dr. Knapman at Westminster under the provisions of The Coroners' Act 1988. Subsequently, Dr. Knapman appointed Lady Justice Hallett to be his Assistant Deputy Coroner, and she eventually held inquests into the deaths.

Inquest into Diana, Princess of Wales and Dodi Al-Fayed, 2007
The death of Diana, Princess of Wales and Mr. Dodi Al-Fayed occurred on 31 August 1997 in Paris. The cause was a collision involving the car in which they were both travelling in the Alma tunnel hitting a pillar at speed inside the tunnel. Both bodies were repatriated to London.

Due to protracted enquiries and legal difficulties, the delayed inquests into both were opened eventually on 6 January 2004 by Michael Burgess, HM Coroner for Surrey and The Royal Household. Subsequently, he announced he would resign from the cases said to be due to "heavy and constant workload" on 24 July 2006, and he appointed Lady Butler-Sloss as his deputy.

Following court proceedings in the High Court on 2 March 2007, Paul Knapman was appointed Coroner. He appointed Lady Butler-Sloss, a retired Court of Appeal Judge to hear the inquests as his Assistant Deputy Coroner. She resigned on 24 April 2007.  On 7 June 2007 Knapman appointed Lord Justice Scott Baker as his Assistant Deputy Coroner to hear the cases. He then held inquests into both Diana, Princess of Wales and Dodi Al-Fayed which began on 2 October 2007.

The jury returned a verdict of "unlawful killing" implicating the driver Henri Paul and the paparazzi.

Posts held
 President of The Old Epsomian Club in 1999
 Honorary Colonel Westminster Dragoons
 President of the Coroner's Society in 2009
 President of the Clinical Forensic and Legal section of The Royal Society of Medicine 1995–1997
 Master of the Worshipful Society of Apothecaries 2006–2007
 Representative Deputy Lieutenant for Westminster 2013 – (Greater London Lieutenancy)

Charitable work

Paul Knapman was Chairman of Governors of The London Nautical School 1997 -1999, having been a governor for eighteen years in total. He helped found the charity, the Coroners' Courts Support Service, with a pilot scheme in his court, which commenced in January 2003.The charity won the research, advice and support category of The Charity Awards (UK) 2011. He was the Chairman of the board of trustees of the charity until 2011. He is a trustee of The St. John's Wood Alms Houses and The Society of Apothecaries Charitable Trust. He is a member of the Management Committee of Westminster Boating Base.

Books and publications
 The Law and Practice on Coroners (3rd Edition 1985)
 Medicine and the Law (1989)
 Casebook on Coroners (1989)
 Sources on Coroners Law (1999)
 "Medical Negligence" (1990) (2nd Edition 1994)
 "Atkins' Court Forms Volume 13"1992) (Volume 13 2000)

References

<ref>Coroner for Inner West London ex parte Dallaglio JP 133 CA<ref>
2)Part 1<ref>Public Inquiry into identification of victims following major transport accidents 2001 CMD 5012/ref>,

External links
 Judges Rule that Dr Paul Knapman should have jurisdiction over Princess Diana and Dodi Fayed Deaths
 http://news.bbc.co.uk/1/hi/uk/1061472.stm
 https://www.independent.co.uk/voices/the-bereaved-deserve-better-1611075.html
 https://sites.google.com/site/marchionessaction/Home/chronology-of-events-since-1989
 https://www.telegraph.co.uk/news/uknews/1377633/Coroner-decried-as-butcher-in-Marchioness-row.html
 http://truestory.com

20th-century British medical doctors
People educated at Epsom College
Alumni of King's College London
Living people
British coroners
Deputy Lieutenants of Greater London
Year of birth missing (living people)